The men's road race, one of the cycling events at the 2012 Olympic Games in London, took place on 28 July at 10 a.m. in central and southwest London and north Surrey, starting and finishing on The Mall.

This was the 19th appearance of the event, previously held in 1896 and then at every Summer Olympics since 1936. It replaced the individual time trial event that had been held from 1912 to 1932; the time trial had been re-introduced in 1996 alongside the road race

Samuel Sánchez of Spain would have been the defending champion, but due to an injury incurred at the 2012 Tour de France he could not compete.

The race was won by Kazakhstan's Alexander Vinokourov. He sprinted clear of Colombia's Rigoberto Urán, who claimed the silver medal. Alexander Kristoff of Norway won the sprint from the following group to take bronze. Vinokourov was the first man (and, through the 2016 Games, only; multiple women have done so) to win multiple medals in the event; he had previously taken silver in 2000.

Qualification

The top ten ranked countries in the final standings of the 2011 UCI World Tour qualified to have five riders to represent their respective country in the race. The nations with five-man squads were: Spain, Belgium, Italy, Australia, Great Britain, Germany, Netherlands, United States and Switzerland; although Luxembourg placed ninth in the rankings, their roster was reduced to two men. Of the other nations on the World Tour, France and Denmark had four riders, Norway and Ireland three, Kazakhstan two and Slovakia, Costa Rica and Latvia one rider each. The top six countries on the UCI Europe Tour – Slovenia, Russia, Portugal, Poland, Turkey and Belarus – in addition to Colombia, Venezuela, Brazil, the UCI America Tour top three, UCI Asia Tour leaders Iran and UCI Africa Tour leaders Morocco, had three riders. The remaining nations in the race were represented by either two or one rider. Eritrea, Georgia, and Syria competed in the event for the first time. There were a total of 144 participants.

Pre-race favourites
The Belfast Telegraph columnist The Punter considered the 2011 World Road Race champion, Mark Cavendish of Great Britain to be the favourite for the race, although his chances were likely dependent on whether the race ended in a sprint finish. Cavendish was expected to be greatly assisted by his four-man British team which he labelled his 'dream team' prior to the race and regarded by Bradley Wiggins as 'possibly the strongest fielded in an Olympic road race'. The race did not go as planned as Ian Stannard, David Millar, Chris Froome, and Wiggins all finished beyond 90th place and Cavendish came across in 29th.

Tom Boonen of Belgium, Australia's Matthew Goss, André Greipel of Germany were also tipped as potential winners. 
Other sprinters tipped for Medals included Tour de France points classification winner Peter Sagan of Slovakia and Edvald Boasson Hagen of Norway – but both riders had perceived weaker teams than those of Great Britain, Belgium and Germany. If the race was to have ended in a sprint finish, Sagan and Boonen were tipped for victory, along with other classic specialists such as Fabian Cancellara of Switzerland, the silver medalist in 2008, and Philippe Gilbert of Belgium.

The defending champion, Samuel Sánchez of Spain, did not enter the race due to an injury suffered at the 2012 Tour de France.

Course
 
Crowds were bolstered by free entry for 150 km of the 250 km route, recent British success in the 2012 Tour de France and the possibility of the host nation winning its first gold medal of the 2012 Olympics through Mark Cavendish. Originally 3,500 paid tickets were made available for the grandstand area on Box Hill where the cyclists would undertake nine laps, but due to demand this was increased to 15,000.

Schedule

All times are British Summer Time (UTC+1)

Results

 
The entry list was published on 23 July.

In the table below, "s.t." indicates that the rider crossed the finish line in the same group as the cyclist before him, and was therefore credited with the same finishing time.

Over time limit (OTL)
Under UCI regulations for one-day road races (article 2.3.039), "Any rider finishing in a time exceeding that of the winner by more than 5% shall not be placed". Applying this to the winning time of Alexander Vinokourov resulted in a time limit of 6 hours, 3 minutes and 14 seconds.

References

Men's road race
Cycling at the Summer Olympics – Men's road race
2012 Men's Cycling
Men's events at the 2012 Summer Olympics